Elm Swamp is a small lake located northeast of the hamlet of Lewbeach in Delaware County, New York. Elm Swamp drains south via an unnamed creek that flows into Pea Brook.

See also
 List of lakes in New York

References 

Lakes of New York (state)
Lakes of Delaware County, New York